Tronick is a surname. Notable people with the surname include:

Edward Tronick, American developmental psychologist
Michael Tronick (born 1949), American film editor